ʼKsan is a historical village and living museum of the Gitxsan Indigenous people in the Skeena Country of Northwestern British Columbia, Canada. ʼKsan is located near Hazelton at the confluence of the Skeena and Bulkley Rivers on Gitxsan territory.

History

ʼKsan was founded before Hazelton was in 1866, and was populated by the Gitxsan Indigenous people.

See also
 Hagwilgyet
 Kitwanga Fort National Historic Site
 Old Hazelton, British Columbia (Gitanmaax)
 X̱á:ytem

References

External links 
 

Museums in British Columbia
Gitxsan
Skeena Country
Living museums in Canada
First Nations museums in Canada
First Nations history in British Columbia